Carlos Martín Vigaray (born 7 September 1994) is a Spanish professional footballer who plays for Real Zaragoza as a right-back.

Club career

Getafe
Born in Leganés, Community of Madrid, Vigaray finished his youth career with Getafe CF's youth setup, and made his senior debut with the reserves in the 2012–13 season, in Segunda División B. On 31 May 2013, he signed a new two-year contract with the club.

On 16 January 2014, Vigaray played his first official match with the first team, starting in a 0–2 home loss against FC Barcelona in the round of 16 of the Copa del Rey. Exactly one month later, due to many injuries to the defensive sector, he first appeared in La Liga, featuring the full 90 minutes in a 0–3 defeat to Real Madrid also at the Coliseum Alfonso Pérez.

Vigaray scored his first professional goal on 17 December 2014, the first in a 2–1 away win against SD Eibar in the Spanish Cup (5–1 on aggregate). On 11 June of the following year, he signed a new two-year deal with Geta and was definitely promoted to the main squad.

On 24 October 2015, Vigaray committed two penalty kicks that resulted in as many yellow cards, with the subsequent 60th-minute dismissal and goals by Éver Banega and Kevin Gameiro in an eventual 5–0 loss at Sevilla FC. He scored his first-ever league goal the following 1 May, helping his team to a 2–0 away victory over Deportivo de La Coruña.

Alavés
On 13 August 2016, Vigaray signed a three-year contract with Deportivo Alavés also in the top tier. He struggled with injuries and competition from youth graduate Martín Aguirregabiria during his spell at the club, being mainly a backup option.

Zaragoza
On 11 July 2019, free agent Vigaray joined Segunda División side Real Zaragoza on a four-year deal.

References

External links

1994 births
Living people
People from Leganés
Spanish footballers
Footballers from the Community of Madrid
Association football defenders
La Liga players
Segunda División players
Segunda División B players
Getafe CF B players
Getafe CF footballers
Deportivo Alavés players
Real Zaragoza players